In mathematics, a regular measure on a topological space is a measure for which every measurable set can be approximated from above by open measurable sets and from below by compact measurable sets.

Definition

Let (X, T) be a topological space and let Σ be a σ-algebra on X.  Let μ be a measure on (X, Σ).  A measurable subset A of X is said to be inner regular if

and said to be outer regular if

A measure is called inner regular if every  measurable set is inner regular. Some authors use a different definition: a measure is called inner regular if every open measurable set is inner regular.
A measure is called outer regular if every measurable set is outer regular.
A measure is called regular if it is outer regular and inner regular.

Examples

Regular measures

 Lebesgue measure on the real line is a regular measure: see the regularity theorem for Lebesgue measure.
 Any Baire probability measure on any locally compact σ-compact Hausdorff space is a regular measure.
Any Borel probability measure on a locally compact Hausdorff space with a countable base for its topology, or compact metric space, or Radon space, is regular.

Inner regular measures that are not outer regular

The Borel measure on the plane that assigns to any Borel set the sum of the (1-dimensional) measures of its horizontal sections is inner regular but not outer regular, as every non-empty open set has infinite measure. A variation of this example is a disjoint union of an uncountable number of copies of the real line with Lebesgue measure.
The topological space X has as underlying set the subset of the real plane given by the y-axis of points (0,y) together with the points (1/n,m/n2) with m,n positive integers. The topology is given as follows. The single points (1/n,m/n2) are all open sets. A base of neighborhoods of the point (0,y) is given by wedges consisting of  all points in X of the form (u,v) with |v − y| ≤ |u| ≤ 1/n for a positive integer n. This space X is locally compact. The measure μ is given by letting the y-axis have measure 0 and letting the point (1/n,m/n2) have measure 1/n3. This measure is inner regular and locally finite, but is not outer regular as any open set containing the y-axis has measure infinity.

Outer regular measures that are not inner regular

If μ is the inner regular measure in the previous example, and M is the measure given by M(S) = infU⊇S μ(U) where the inf is taken over all open sets containing the Borel set S, then M is an outer regular locally finite Borel measure on a locally compact Hausdorff space that is not inner regular in the strong sense, though all open sets are inner regular so it is inner regular in the weak sense. The measures M and μ coincide on all open sets, all compact sets, and all sets on which M has finite measure. The y-axis has infinite M-measure though all compact subsets of it have measure 0.
A measurable cardinal with the discrete topology has a Borel probability measure such that every compact subset has measure 0, so this measure is outer regular but not inner regular. The existence of measurable cardinals cannot be proved in ZF set theory but (as of 2013) is thought to be consistent with it.

Measures that are neither inner nor outer regular

The space of all ordinals at most equal to the first uncountable ordinal Ω, with the topology generated by open intervals, is a compact Hausdorff space. The measure that assigns measure 1 to Borel sets containing an unbounded closed subset of the countable ordinals and assigns 0 to other Borel sets is a Borel probability measure that is neither inner regular nor outer regular.

See also

 Borel regular measure
 Radon measure
 Regularity theorem for Lebesgue measure

References

 
   (See chapter 2)
 

Measures (measure theory)